The following are National Recreation Trails in Nebraska.

References

National Recreation Trails
National Recreation Trails
 
National Recreation Trails